Chek Deth is a 1972 Cambodian film directed by Yvon Hem. The film stars Kong Som Eun and Vichara Dany.

Cast
Kong Som Eun
Vichara Dany
Phoung Polly
Huy San

Soundtrack

References

1972 films
Khmer-language films
Cambodian drama films